Vine Street Hill Cemetery is a notable nonprofit cemetery located at 3701 Vine Street, Cincinnati, Ohio.

History 
Members of the German Evangelical Reform Churches of St. Peter and St. Paul of Cincinnati founded the cemetery, now known as the Vine Street Hill Cemetery in 1849. On February 26, 1850 the first land for the cemetery was purchased from Samuel West. In August 1882 additional land was purchased from F. Feldman and S. West.

The cemetery was originally known as the German Evangelical Protestant Cemetery on Carthage Road or just Carthage Road Cemetery, located three and one half miles from the City of Cincinnati. The name of Carthage for this section of the road starting north of Glenmary Avenue was changed to Vine Street after the suburb of Clifton was annexed to Cincinnati in 1896.

The original and main entrance to the cemetery is 3701 Vine Street and the cemetery became known as the Vine Street Hill Cemetery in 1941.

The German-American architect-builders George and August Brink of Cincinnati designed the chapel located in the center of the cemetery. Cost estimates for the new chapel complex was $15,000 as reported in an article appearing in The Inland Architect in 1884. The German Evangelical Protestant Cemetery Chapel was named to the National Register of Historic Places on February 28, 2008. The chapel's architectural details and craftsmanship expands knowledge of the work and contributions of German-American architects-builders and the specific contributions of George and August Brink to late nineteenth century Cincinnati.

George and August Brink are also credited for the remodeling of John Hauck's home on Dayton Street in Cincinnati. John Hauck was a prominent German-American brewer in Cincinnati and his home is now a museum within the Dayton Street Historic District.

Notable burials 

August Bloedner, designer of the 32nd Indiana Monument
August "Garry" Herrmann, Cincinnati politician, owner of Cincinnati Reds, chairman of the National Baseball Commission
Nick Altrock, Major League Baseball player
Edward William Boers, Medal of Honor recipient
Phelps "Catfish" Collins, guitarist
William Edward Voll (1893-1982), Pitcher for the Cincinnati Red Stockings

Sources 
 The Hamilton County Chapter of the Ohio Genealogical Society, Hamilton County, Ohio Burial Records. Volume Three; “Vine Street Hill Cemetery 1852-1977.” Cincinnati, OH 1991
 Segal, Alfred. Cincinnati Post & Times Star. “In Which We Report on 3701 Vine.” (June 30, 1962)
 Vine Street Hill Cemetery Association, History of Vine Street Hill Cemetery
 The Inland Architect, IV, 2 (September 1884), p. 31
 Cook, William A., August "Garry" Herrmann, A Baseball Biography, McFarland & Company, Inc. Publishers, Jefferson, NC 2008
 Langsam, Walter E. Great Houses of the Queen City, Two Hundred Years of Historic and Contemporary Architecture and Interiors in Cincinnati and Northern Kentucky. The Cincinnati Historical Society, Cincinnati, OH 1997

References

External links 
 National Register of Historic Places

History of Cincinnati
Protestant Reformed cemeteries
Cemeteries in Hamilton County, Ohio
German-American culture in Cincinnati
1849 establishments in Ohio
Architecture in Ohio
National Register of Historic Places in Cincinnati